Aha! is a cloud-based software company that provides product development software for companies in the United States and internationally. Aha! offers Software-as-a-Service (SaaS) products for organizations to set strategy, ideate, plan, showcase, build, and launch new products and enhancements.

Product managers (PMs), engineers, and product development teams — including innovation management programs, portfolio management, product marketing, and operations — use the Aha! suite of products to bring ideas from raw concept to market.

As of 2023, more than 700,000 product builders from companies of all sizes use the Aha! suite of products.

Capabilities 
Aha! helps users take a strategic and value-based approach to building and delivering new products and services. Its suite of products includes Aha! Roadmaps, Aha! Ideas, Aha! Create, Aha! Develop, and Aha! Academy.

Using the Aha! suite enables teams to bring a raw concept to finished product — all within a unified product development platform. Users can think collaboratively, capture ideas, define a product strategy, manage agile development, and deliver new capabilities to market.

The software provides functionality for users to link strategic goals and initiatives to their work, create visual roadmaps of upcoming plans, and track key business objectives through product management and development. Aha! also enables teams to capture ideas, prioritize and assign work, set schedules, customize workflows, and collaborate with stakeholders directly in the tool. A mobile application for iPhone and Android is available.

Aha! is integrated with many third party applications including Jira, GitHub, Azure DevOps Server, Pivotal Tracker, Trello, FogBugz, Jellyfish,Redmine, Zendesk, Salesforce, Google Analytics, and Slack and has a rest-based API.

History 
Aha! is a self-funded, private company, founded by Brian de Haaff and Dr. Chris Waters in the spring of 2013 in Menlo Park, California. It has always been distributed — there is no centralized headquarters, so employees can remotely work from anywhere in the United States and select international locations.

In 2017, Aha! co-founder and CEO Brian de Haaff shared his philosophy on building successful businesses and products in Lovability. The bestselling book details how Aha! puts people, profit, and performance first — to inspire others to build companies and products that people love.

In 2019 and 2020, Aha! expanded their roadmapping software use case beyond product management to include purpose-built workspaces for other types of teams: marketing, IT, services, project management, and business operations.

In October 2020, Aha! launched Aha! Ideas to give teams a way to crowdsource ideas from customers, employees, and partners and incorporate those ideas into product plans. In May 2021, the company released Aha! Develop, a fully extendable agile development tool for engineering teams.

In 2022, Aha! introduced a digital notebook called Aha! Create. Teams can record thoughts, whiteboard concepts, and collaborate on ideas. The company also announced that they surpassed $100 million in annual recurring revenue (ARR) and launched The Bootstrap Movement, an approach to sustainable business growth that emphasizes self-reliance and value exchange over pursuing outside funding.

The company has donated more than $1 million to people in need through Aha! Cares, its philanthropic giving program.

Recognition 
Aha! has been included on many lists of the best places to work, including Forbes, LinkedIn, and WeWorkRemotely.

In 2018, Aha! was #143 on the Inc. 500 list of fastest-growing private companies in the U.S and #13 of all software companies.

Aha! also ranked #50 on Deloitte’s 2018 Technology Fast 500 and in the top 100 on Forbes' 2021 list of best startups.

In 2022, Fortune featured Aha! in an article about how to bootstrap over accepting outside funding. 

Forbes Advisor  named Aha! software as “Best for roadmapping” in its roundup of The Best Business Plan Software of 2023.

See also 
 Software development
 Software engineering
 Software product management

References 

 Bridgwater, Adrian (2013-08-17) "Aha! Launches Roadmapping With Extra Mojo" Dr. Dobbs. Retrieved 2014-09-08
 Forman, Aaron (2014-03-04) "Atlassian launches Atlassian Connect with Aha!" Atlassian Blog. Retrieved 2014-09-08
 IDG Connect (2013-08-13) "Aha! streamlines development with cloud-based project management platform" IDG Connect. Retrieved 2014-09-08

External links 
 

Companies based in Silicon Valley
Companies based in Menlo Park, California
Software companies based in the San Francisco Bay Area
Software companies established in 2013
2013 establishments in California
Privately held companies based in California
Software companies of the United States
2013 establishments in the United States
Companies established in 2013